The British Academy Children and Young People Award for  is an award presented annually by the British Academy of Film and Television Arts (BAFTA). It is given to "television and online content where the editorial and creative control resides outside of the UK". It was first presented at the 3rd British Academy Children's Awards in 1998, with Australian science-fiction television series Ocean Girl being the first recipient of the award. In 2018, three interntional categories were presented (Animation, Live-Action, Pre-School), while in 2019, two of the three were awarded (Animation and Live-Action). In 2022, the category returned to be only one category for international productions.

Out of the twenty-six winners, eighteen have been animated programs while eight have been live-action series. United States holds the records of the country with most wins in the category, with twenty of the winners being American productions or co-productions. Only three programs have won the award more than once: American series SpongeBob SquarePants holds the record of most wins with four followed by The Penguins of Madagascar and Adventure Time with two wins each. SpongeBob SquarePants is also the series with most nominations in the category with eight, followed by Phineas and Ferb with five, and Adventure Time and Doc McStuffins with four each.

Winners and nominees

1990s

2000s

2010s

2020s

Note: The series that don't have recipients on the tables had Production team credited as recipients for the award or nomination.

Multiple wins

Multiple nominations

References

External links
Official website

International